Léon Moreau (13 July 1870 – 11 April 1946) was a French/Breton composer, winner of the second prize for composition in the Prix de Rome of 1899.

Born in Brest, he was active as a piano teacher and composer in Brest and Paris. A member of the short-lived Association des Compositeurs Bretons, he also wrote a number of film scores for the silent era (1894-1929), and also saxophone pieces for Elise Hall.

Works (selection)
 Film scores 
1913: L'Agonie de Byzance by Louis Feuillade
1922: The Agony of the Eagles by Dominique Bernard-Deschamps and Julien Duvivier
1928: Madame Récamier by Tony Lekain and Gaston Ravel

Bibliography
 Séverine Abhervé: Discours des compositeurs de musique sur le cinématographe en France (1919–1937): Ambitions, obstacles et horizons d'attente, on 1895.Mille huit cent quatre-vingt-quinze, 65, 2011, accessdate 28 June 2016

External links
 
 Léon Moreau on BnF

1870 births
1946 deaths
20th-century classical composers
Chevaliers of the Légion d'honneur
French classical composers
French male classical composers
French film score composers
French opera librettists
Musicians from Brest, France
Prix de Rome for composition
20th-century French composers
20th-century French male musicians